The  are a Japanese women's softball team based in Ogaki, Gifu. The Minamo compete in the Japan Diamond Softball League (JD.League) as a member of the league's East Division.

History
The Minamo were founded in 2010, as the Ogaki Minamo Softball Club.

The Japan Diamond Softball League (JD.League) was founded in 2022, and the Minamo became part of the new league as a member of the East Division.

Roster

References

External links
 
 Ogaki Minamo - JD.League

Japan Diamond Softball League
Women's softball teams in Japan
Sports teams in Gifu Prefecture